Zaozerny is a rural locality (a settlement) in Svetloozyorsky Selsoviet, Biysky District, Altai Krai, Russia. The population was 231 as of 2013. There are 2 streets.

Geography 
Zaozerny is located 33 km east of Biysk (the district's administrative centre) by road. Svetloozyorskoye is the nearest rural locality.

References 

Rural localities in Biysky District